The Wilson Staffordshire Inter-Club Tennis League is a regional tennis league incorporating all of Staffordshire and parts of Worcestershire. The League is currently sponsored by Wilson Sporting Goods .

History
The first competition held under the league was in 1936. Except for during World War II, a competition has been held annually.

The league currently has 36 clubs with 86 men's teams and 46 ladies teams.

Clubs

Champions

References 

Tennis in England